Beck Lakes are twin lakes in Madera County, California, in the United States.

Beck Lakes were named for John Beck, a mine owner.

See also
List of lakes in California

References

Lakes of California
Lakes of Madera County, California
Lakes of Northern California